Joshua Reeves (born November 6, 1992) is an American professional stock car racing driver. He last competed part-time in the NASCAR Camping World Truck Series, driving the No. 66 for Mike Harmon Racing.

Motorsports career results

NASCAR
(key) (Bold – Pole position awarded by qualifying time. Italics – Pole position earned by points standings or practice time. * – Most laps led.)

Camping World Truck Series

ARCA Racing Series

(key) (Bold – Pole position awarded by qualifying time. Italics – Pole position earned by points standings or practice time. * – Most laps led.)

References

External links
 

1992 births
NASCAR drivers
Living people
Racing drivers from Virginia
ARCA Menards Series drivers